Smash Up the Workhouse! was a pamphlet published in 1911 by Labour Party politician George Lansbury. It argued for the abolition of the workhouse system.

References

Poor Law in Britain and Ireland
Pamphlets
1911 in the United Kingdom
1911 in politics
1911 non-fiction books
History of the Labour Party (UK)